The 2014 Atlantic hurricane season was an event in the annual hurricane season in the north Atlantic Ocean. It featured below-average tropical cyclone activity, with the fewest named storms since the 1997 season. The season officially began on June 1, 2014 and ended on November 30, 2014. These dates, adopted by convention, historically describe the period in each year when most tropical systems form. Even so, there were no named storms during either the opening or closing months of the season, as the first, Hurricane Arthur, developed on July 1, and the last, Tropical Storm Hanna, dissipated on October 28.

Altogether, eight tropical storms formed during the season, including six hurricanes of which two intensified into major hurricanes. There was also one tropical depression that failed to reach tropical storm strength. Impact throughout the year was widespread. Arthur, which made landfall near Cape Lookout, North Carolina on July 3, with  winds, was the strongest hurricane to strike the U.S. mainland since Hurricane Ike in 2008 (with  winds). The deadliest Atlantic storm of the season, Cristobal, barely touched land at all as it moved from Puerto Rico to Iceland in late August. Even so, it was responsible for at least seven fatalities: four on Hispaniola, one on Providenciales, and two along the U.S. East Coast. In October, Bermuda was struck twice, as hurricanes Fay and Gonzalo made landfall only six days apart (October 12 and 18 respectively), leaving much damage in their wakes.

This timeline documents tropical cyclone formations, strengthening, weakening, landfalls, extratropical transitions, and dissipations during the season. It includes information that was not released throughout the season, meaning that data from post-storm reviews by the National Hurricane Center, such as a storm that was not initially warned upon, has been included.

By convention, meteorologists use one time zone when issuing forecasts and making observations: Coordinated Universal Time (UTC), and also use the 24-hour clock (where 00:00 = midnight UTC). The National Hurricane Center uses both UTC and the time zone where the center of the tropical cyclone is currently located. The time zones utilized (east to west) prior to 2020 were: Atlantic, Eastern, and Central. In this timeline, all information is listed by UTC first with the respective regional time included in parentheses. Additionally, figures for maximum sustained winds and position estimates are rounded to the nearest 5 units (knots, miles, or kilometers), following the convention used in the National Hurricane Center's products. Direct wind observations are rounded to the nearest whole number. Atmospheric pressures are listed to the nearest millibar and nearest hundredth of an inch of mercury.

Timeline

June

June 1
The 2014 Atlantic hurricane season officially begins.

 No tropical cyclones form in the Atlantic Ocean during the month of June.

July

July 1
 12:00 UTC (8:00 a.m.

July 3
 00:00 UTC (8:00 p.m.

July 4
 00:00 UTC (8:00 p.m.
 03:15 UTC (11:15 p.m.
 06:00 UTC (2:00 a.m.
 08:00 UTC (4:00 a.m.
 12:00 UTC (8:00 a.m.

July 5
 06:00 UTC (2:00 a.m.
 12:00 UTC (8:00 a.m.

July 21
12:00 UTC (8:00 a.m.

July 23
 12:00 UTC (18:00 a.m.

August

August 1
 00:00 UTC (8:00 a.m.

August 3
14:00 UTC (10:00 a.m.

August 4
 12:00 UTC (8:00 a.m.

August 5
 06:00 UTC (2:00 a.m.

August 6
 18:00 UTC (2:00 p.m.

August 23
 18:00 UTC (2:00 p.m.

August 24
 06:00 UTC (2:00 a.m.

August 26
 00:00 UTC (8:00 p.m.

August 29
 00:00 UTC (8:00 p.m.
 12:00 UTC (8:00 a.m.

September

September 1
 18:00 UTC (1:00 p.m.

September 2
 00:00 UTC (7:00 p.m.
 12:00 UTC (7:00 a.m.

September 3
 01:00 UTC (8:00 p.m.
 04:00 UTC (11:00 p.m.

September 11
 12:00 UTC (8:00 a.m.

September 12
 00:00 UTC (8:00 p.m.

September 14
 12:00 UTC (8:00 a.m.

September 15
 06:00 UTC (2:00 a.m.

September 16
 06:00 UTC (2:00 a.m.
 12:00 UTC (8:00 a.m.
 18:00 UTC (2:00 p.m.

September 17
12:00 UTC (8:00 a.m.

September 19
00:00 UTC (8:00 p.m.
 18:00 UTC (2:00 p.m.

October

October 10
 06:00 UTC (2:00 a.m.

October 11
 06:00 UTC (2:00 a.m.

October 12
 00:00 UTC (8:00 p.m.
 06:00 UTC (2:00 a.m.
 08:10 UTC (4:10 a.m.
 12:00 UTC (8:00 a.m.
 12:00 UTC (8:00 a.m.
 18:00 UTC (2:00 p.m.

October 13
 00:00 (8:00 p.m.
 12:00 UTC (8:00 a.m.
 14:30 UTC (10:30 a.m.
 22:45 UTC (6:45 p.m.
 23:15 UTC (7:15 p.m.

October 14
 06:00 UTC (2:00 a.m.
 18:00 UTC (2:00 p.m.

October 15
 00:00 UTC (8:00 p.m.
 18:00 UTC (2:00 p.m.

October 16
06:00 UTC (2:00 a.m.
 12:00 UTC (8:00 a.m.

October 17
 12:00 UTC (8:00 a.m.

October 18
 00:00 UTC (8:00 p.m.
 00:30 UTC (8:30 p.m.

October 19
 06:00 UTC (2:00 a.m.
 18:00 UTC (2:00 p.m.

October 22
 00:00 UTC (7:00 p.m.

October 23
 00:00 UTC (7:00 p.m.

October 25
 00:00 UTC (8:00 p.m. EDT, October 24) near Remnant Low Nine opens into a trough over the Caribbean Sea, east of the Yucatán Peninsula.

October 26
 12:00 UTC (8:00 a.m.

October 27
 00:00 UTC (7:00 p.m.
 06:00 UTC (2:00 a.m.
 16:00 UTC (12:00 p.m.
 18:00 UTC (2:00 p.m.

October 28
 06:00 UTC (2:00 a.m.

November

 No tropical cyclones form in the Atlantic Ocean during the month of November.

November 30
 The 2000 Atlantic hurricane season officially ends.

See also

Lists of Atlantic hurricanes
Timeline of the 2014 Pacific hurricane season

Notes

References

External links

 2014 Tropical Cyclone Advisory Archive, National Hurricane Center and Central Pacific Hurricane Center
 Hurricanes and Tropical Storms – Annual 2014, National Centers for Environmental Information

2014 Atlantic hurricane season
2014
Articles which contain graphical timelines
2014 ATL T